Pirwayuq (Quechua pirwa deposit / the planet Jupiter, -yuq a suffix to indicate ownership, "the one with a deposit", Hispanicized spelling Pirhuayoc) is an archaeological site in Peru. It is situated in the Huancavelica Region, Tayacaja Province, Laria District. The site lies on top of the  mountain Pirwayuq.

See also 
 Inka Mach'ay
 Tampu Mach'ay

References 

Archaeological sites in Peru
Archaeological sites in Huancavelica Region
Mountains of Huancavelica Region
Mountains of Peru